Pilgrimage Music & Cultural Festival is an annual arts festival in Franklin, Tennessee, USA. The two-day festival began in September 2015.

History
Pilgrimage Music & Cultural Festival was co-founded by Better Than Ezra frontman Kevin Griffin. Held at the Franklin's Park at Harlinsdale Farm, the 2015 festival was headlined by Wilco, Willie Nelson, Weezer, The Decemberists and Cage The Elephant.

Beck, Daryl Hall and John Oates and Jason Isbell headlined the 2016 event.

Justin Timberlake (one of its producers), Eddie Vedder, The Avett Brothers, Gary Clark Jr., Ryan Adams and Walk the Moon, led the 2017 line-up.

Jack White, Chris Stapleton and Lionel Richie were among the performers of the 2018 event.

References

Folk festivals in the United States
Franklin, Tennessee
Music festivals established in 2015
Music festivals in Tennessee